The Saturn Vue is a compact SUV that was sold and built by Saturn, and it was Saturn's best-selling model. It was the first vehicle to use the GM Theta platform when it was introduced in 2001 for the 2002 model year. The Vue was later facelifted for the 2006 model year. A second generation model was launched in 2007 for the 2008 model year as a rebadged Opel Antara. The Vue production in North America ended as GM wound down the Saturn brand during its 2009 reorganization.


First generation (2002) 

The Vue was introduced for the 2002 model year and was designed by Saturn. It was manufactured at the Spring Hill GM plant. Its unibody platform is shared with the Chevrolet Equinox, Pontiac Torrent and the European Opel Antara. The first generation ran from model year 2002–2007.

The Vue was offered in either 4 or V6 trim levels, with either a four-cylinder (I4) or V6 gasoline engine, and either a manual or automatic transmission. A sportier Red Line trim was added starting with the 2004 model year. A Green Line (Hybrid Electric Vehicle) was added for the final model year of the first-generation Vue (2007). Front Wheel Drive (FWD) and All Wheel Drive (AWD) were offered.

Four-cylinder Vues use the Ecotec I4. The L81 V6 from the L-Series and five-speed Aisin AF33 automatic transmission were initially offered, but starting in 2004, all six-cylinder Vues were equipped with Honda's  J35A3 engine and a Honda transmission. The four-cylinder Vue was available with the VTi continuously variable transmission (CVT) until GM canceled it for 2005 due to dependability issues.

The Vue received a facelift for the 2006 model year. Upgrades included a redesigned interior with higher-quality materials, a new bumper and grille, and some minor cosmetic pieces to the exterior. OnStar is now standard as well as cruise control and automatic headlights. However, GM badges were not added to the side of the vehicle until GM took over production from Saturn for the second generation Vue.

Model year changes
In 2003:

 The FWD V6 configuration was offered part-way through the model year. This included the L81 V6 mated to the Aisin AF33 5 speed automatic transmission.

In 2004:

The Vue Red Line was released
V6 models received Honda's J35S1 engine and Honda transmission. This 3.5 liter engine and  5 speed transmission boosted performance over the prior V-6. It was an important selling point at the time. This V-6 engine was used in the Saturn Vue 2004 to 2007 model years.
In 2005:
For the FWD 4 configuration, the GM 4-speed automatic transmission arrived in 2005, and the CVT was dropped. The AWD 4 configuration with the CVT was sold for the 2005 model year until existing stock was depleted, and was then discontinued.
Exterior color Storm Grey, Pacific Blue & Dragonfly green added. Electric Blue, Electric Lime & Rainforest green are discontinued.

In 2006:
Facelift with redesigned interior including a new center console, center stack & upgraded interior trim. New radio was well received with features like aux in & satellite radio. New front & rear fascias.
Fusion Orange exterior color added

In 2007:

 Green Line model added
 Fusion Orange exterior color dropped; "Deep Blue" exterior color replaces "Pacific Blue".

Red Line 

Saturn introduced a special high-performance line of vehicles in 2004 under the name, "Red Line". The Vue Red Line includes the same  Honda J35A3 V6 as the regular model, but with sportier suspension tuning, lowered 1 inch, and unique power steering calibration for performance, 18 in alloy wheels, ground-effect front and rear bumpers, unique rocker panel trim, chrome exhaust tip, special black leather and suede seats (optional for 2005, standard for 2006 and 2007), footwell lighting (included with leather and suede seats package, not available with optional full-leather (heated front) seats), and a special gauge cluster complete the visual updates. It also includes some special interior features as well, such as a higher quality audio system.

Green Line 

The high-performance Vue Red Line was joined for 2007 by an environmentally oriented Green Line model. The Vue is a mild hybrid, or "assist hybrid", using what GM calls a "belt alternator starter" BAS Hybrid system. A large electric motor is connected to the crankshaft via a special accessory drive belt, with a modified automatic transmission fitted.

It automatically stops the engine when the vehicle comes to a halt and instantly restarts it when the vehicle must move again. Not to be confused as just a "start-stop" system, the electric motor also assists somewhat during initial launch, during torque smoothing and when under heavy acceleration. A 36-volt nickel metal hydride (NiMH) battery pack, located under the load floor, powers the motor/generator unit and also stores regenerative braking energy. The regenerative charging and electric motor assist functions are shown to the driver via an analog gauge on the dash board, and real-time fuel-economy feedback is accomplished via an "eco" light that glows when the instantaneous fuel economy is beating the window sticker fuel economy values.

The fuel savings are 20 percent up from the base vehicle's / city/highway EPA sticker to /, the highest highway fuel economy of any 2007 model SUV sold in the US market. In Canada, according to Saturn, the Vue gets an estimated  city and  highway.

The Green Line has a  2.4-liter Ecotec DOHC-phaser engine which replaces the standard  2.2-liter inline-four engine, resulting in the improvement of  acceleration time by 1.0 second. Pricing for the hybrid is about US$2,000 more than a similarly equipped Vue, and debuted in production form on January 8, 2006 at the North American International Auto Show in Detroit. The Green Line went on sale in the third quarter of 2006.

Engines

Transmissions (First Generation)

Safety 
In Insurance Institute for Highway Safety (IIHS) crash tests the Vue receives a Good overall rating in the frontal offset crash test. In 2008 models came equipped with standard front and rear head side curtain airbags and front seat-mounted torso airbags. These models were given an acceptable overall rating in side impacts. Models without side airbags were given an overall poor rating.

Second generation (2008) 

Saturn introduced the second generation Vue in 2007 for the 2008 model year, manufactured in Mexico as a rebranded version of the German-designed Opel Antara. Saturn offered four trim levels: base "XE", classier, up-level "XR", top-of-the-line sporty "Red Line" and a "Green Line" hybrid trim. Available engines include a 2.4L inline 4 cylinder, as well as 3.5L and a 3.6L V6 options. A hybrid powertrain version of the 2.4-liter model was also available. GM badges were now added to the front doors. The Mexican-manufactured Vue was also retailed in Mexico and South America as the Chevrolet Captiva Sport, with only badges changed and a new grille insert fitted.

Following the demise of the Saturn brand in 2009 for the 2010 model year, the Vue was discontinued. However, GM continued to produce the Chevrolet Captiva Sport, for the Mexican and South American markets. The Chevrolet Captiva Sport was introduced for the US commercial and fleet markets in late 2011 for the 2012 model year.

Sales

References

External links 

Vue
Crossover sport utility vehicles
Compact sport utility vehicles
Hybrid sport utility vehicles
Front-wheel-drive vehicles
Vehicles with CVT transmission
All-wheel-drive vehicles
Cars introduced in 2002
Motor vehicles manufactured in the United States
Plug-in hybrid vehicles